Bruce Hoblitzell (June 25, 1887 – August 11, 1970) was mayor of Louisville, Kentucky from 1957 to 1961. He also served as sheriff of Jefferson County, Kentucky.

Early life
Bruce Hoblitzell was born in 1887, in Louisville, Kentucky. He was raised in Louisville and graduated from duPont Manual High School. He graduated from the Kentucky Military Institute in 1905.

Career
From 1906 to 1912, Hoblitzell worked at the Kentucky Heating Company. He formed the McClellan-Hoblitzell Realty Company with J. A. McClellan in 1912. The company was dissolved in 1919 and became the Bruce Hoblitzell Realtors and Insurance Agency. He was elected sheriff of Jefferson County in 1953. On November 5, 1957, he was elected mayor on the Democratic Party ticket, defeating Republican Robert B. Diehl by about ten thousand votes. He served until November 1961. He was nicknamed "Mr. Hobby".

Personal life
Hoblitzell had a son, Bruce Hoblitzell Jr., and two daughters.

Hoblitzell suffered a stroke in December 1962 and remained bedridden. He died on August 11, 1970, at his home in Louisville. Hoblitzell was buried in Cave Hill Cemetery.

References

1887 births
1970 deaths
Mayors of Louisville, Kentucky
DuPont Manual High School alumni
Burials at Cave Hill Cemetery
20th-century American politicians
American real estate brokers